For the Defense is a surviving 1916 American drama silent film directed by Frank Reicher and written by Hector Turnbull and Margaret Turnbull. The film stars Fannie Ward, Jack Dean, Paul Byron, Horace B. Carpenter, Camille Astor and James Neill. The film was released on March 12, 1916, by Paramount Pictures.

Plot
In New York, traveling from a French convent to one in Montreal, the novice Fidele Roget is captured by a slaver. Running away, the young woman witnesses a murder. He then meets Jim Webster who is about to commit suicide. She dissuades him and he decides to help her get to Canada. On the way, Jim is arrested for murder and tried. The man confides to Fidele that he was framed by his butler, who killed a man and then built the evidence to accuse him. Fidele realizes that it is the same crime he witnessed and decides to unmask the real murderer. Posing as a servant in Webster's house, she manages to trick the butler and make him confess. Jim is cleared and she gives up life in a convent to become his wife.

Cast 
Fannie Ward as Fidele Roget
Jack Dean as Jim Webster
Paul Byron as Richard Madison
Horace B. Carpenter as Henri	
Camille Astor as Ninette
James Neill as Mr. Webster
Gertrude Kellar as Mrs. Webster

Preservation
The film is preserved in the Library of Congress collection.

References

External links 

 

1916 films
1910s English-language films
Silent American drama films
1916 drama films
Paramount Pictures films
American black-and-white films
American silent feature films
Films directed by Frank Reicher
1910s American films